Thomas Anson may refer to:

Thomas Anson (politician, died 1773) (c. 1695–1773), MP for Lichfield
Thomas Anson, 1st Viscount Anson (1767–1818), British politician, great-nephew of the above
Thomas Anson, 1st Earl of Lichfield (1795–1854), British Whig politician, son of the above
Thomas Anson (cricketer) (1818–1899), English cricketer, nephew of the above
Thomas Anson, 2nd Earl of Lichfield (1825–1892), British politician, son of the 1st Earl

See also 
 Earl of Lichfield for more information on the Anson family